Blepharidachne is a small genus of New World plants in the grass family, generally known as eyelashgrass or desertgrass. .

 Species
 Blepharidachne benthamiana - Argentina
 Blepharidachne bigelovii - Texas, New Mexico, Coahuila
 Blepharidachne hitchcockii - Argentina
 Blepharidachne kingii - California, Nevada, Utah, Idaho

See also
 List of Poaceae genera

References

External links
 Jepson Manual Treatment of Blepharidachne
 USDA Plants Profile for Blepharidachne
 Grass Manual Treatment of Blepharidachne

Chloridoideae
Poaceae genera
Grasses of North America
Grasses of South America
Taxa named by Sereno Watson
Taxa named by Eduard Hackel